Abra Amedomé, born Abra Julie Mawupé Vovor was a Togolese politician woman.

Trained as a pharmacist in France, Montpellier, Abra Julie Amedome returned to Togo and became a highly successful businesswoman. She was the first pharmatian woman in Togo. She was married to professor Antoine Afantchao Amedome (professor of médecine).She took a leading role in the national ruling party, and in 1975 became president of the Union National des Femmes Togolaise. In 1979 she became minister of social affairs and women's production, continuing in this role until 1983. She was one of six women elected to the Parliament of Togo in 1979; the others were Cheffi Meatchi, Kossiwa Monsila, Essohana Péré, Zinabou Touré, and Adjoavi Trenou.

References

Living people
20th-century Togolese women politicians
20th-century Togolese politicians
Government ministers of Togo
Social affairs ministers
Members of the National Assembly (Togo)
Togolese women in business
20th-century businesswomen
Togolese pharmacists
Women government ministers of Togo
Year of birth missing (living people)
Place of birth missing (living people)
Women pharmacists
21st-century Togolese people